Armenia competed at the 2020 Winter Youth Olympics in Lausanne, Switzerland from 9 to 22 January 2020.

Cross-country skiing 

Boys

See also
Armenia at the 2020 Summer Olympics

References

2020 in Armenian sport
Nations at the 2020 Winter Youth Olympics
Armenia at the Youth Olympics